Papyrus Oxyrhynchus 156 (P. Oxy. 156 or P. Oxy. I 156) is a letter, written in Greek and discovered in Oxyrhynchus. The manuscript was written on papyrus in the form of a sheet. The document was written in the 6th century. Currently it is housed in the Egyptian Museum (10035) in Cairo.

Description 
The document is a letter from Theodorus, a secretary (chartoularios; χαρτουλάριος) and land-agent, to other secretaries and overseers.  Theodorus asks that Abraham and Nicetes be made bucellarii. The measurements of the fragment are 120 by 330 mm.

It was discovered by Grenfell and Hunt in 1897 in Oxyrhynchus. The text was published by Grenfell and Hunt in 1898.

Text
Recto
Please appoint Abraham and Nicetes, the letter-carriers, bucellarii from the beginning of the month Pharmouthi, and pay them their allowance of wheat, for you know that we require bucellarii.  Be sure to do this without delay.

Verso
To the most illustrious and honorable secretaries and overseers from Theodorus, secretary and by the grace of God land-agent.

See also 
 Oxyrhynchus Papyri
 Papyrus Oxyrhynchus 155
 Papyrus Oxyrhynchus 157

References 

156
6th-century manuscripts
Byzantine manuscripts